Denver is an unincorporated community in Wood County, in the U.S. state of Ohio.

History
Denver was platted in 1875 on the Baltimore and Ohio Railroad line.

References

Unincorporated communities in Wood County, Ohio
Unincorporated communities in Ohio